Lamprostola aglaope is a moth of the subfamily Arctiinae. It was described by Felder in 1875. It is found in Mexico, Guatemala, Costa Rica and the Amazon region.

References

Lithosiini
Moths described in 1875